Gilbert Barbier (born 3 March 1940) was a member of the Senate of France, representing the Jura department.

References

1940 births
Living people
Politicians from Bourgogne-Franche-Comté
French Senators of the Fifth Republic
Senators of Jura (department)
Place of birth missing (living people)